The Americas Zone is one of the three zones of regional Davis Cup competition in 2014.

In the Americas Zone there are three different groups in which teams compete against each other to advance to the next group.

Participating nations

Seeds:

Remaining nations:

Draw

 and  relegated to Group III in 2015.
 promoted to Group I in 2015.

First round

Barbados vs. Chile

Paraguay vs. El Salvador

Bolivia vs. Peru

Guatemala vs. Mexico

Second round

Barbados vs. El Salvador

Mexico vs. Peru

Play-offs

Chile vs. Paraguay

Bolivia vs. Guatemala

Third round

Barbados vs. Mexico

References

External links
Official Website

Americas Zone Group II
Davis Cup Americas Zone